Centro Desportivo e Cultural de Montalegre is a Portuguese Sport and Football club based in the parish of Montalegre in the Vila Real District. It was founded in 1964 and currently plays in the Liga 3, third tier of Portuguese football. They currently play at the Estádio Dr. Diogo Alves Vaz Pereira.

Current squad

References 
CDC Montalegre
Centro Desportivo e Cultural de Montalegre :: Estadísticas :: Títulos :: Títulos :: Historia :: Goles :: Próximos Partidos :: Resultados :: Noticias :: Vídeos :: Fotos :: Plantilla :: ceroacero.es
Centro Desportivo e Cultural de Montalegre

Football clubs in Portugal
Association football clubs established in 1964
1964 establishments in Portugal